Myrnyi or Myrny is a Ukrainian surname. Notable people with the surname include:

 Ivan Myrnyi (born 1954), Ukrainian politician
 Panas Myrny (1849–1920), Ukrainian writer
 Vitaliy Myrnyi (born 1992), Ukrainian footballer

See also
 
 Mirny (disambiguation)

Ukrainian-language surnames